The Lake Malawi sardine, lake sardine, or usipa (Engraulicypris sardella), is an African species of freshwater fish in the family Cyprinidae. It is endemic to Lake Malawi and its outlet, the (upper) Shire River; it is found in Malawi, Mozambique, and Tanzania.

The Lake Malawi sardine is an important fishery species in Lake Malawi, both as a food fish and as bait. It is a pelagic, shoaling species that feeds on zooplankton. It grows to a maximum size of  TL, though commonly they are smaller.

References

Engraulicypris
Fish of Lake Malawi
Fish of Malawi
Fish of Mozambique
Freshwater fish of Tanzania
Commercial fish
Fish described in 1868
Taxa named by Albert Günther
Taxonomy articles created by Polbot